Region 4 or Region IV can refer to:

 One of the DVD region codes
 Region 4, Northwest Territories (Canadian census)
The West of the US (one of four regions of the US census)
 One of the health regions of Canada managed by Vitalité Health Network
 Former Region 4 (Johannesburg), an administrative district in the city of Johannesburg, South Africa, from 2000 to 2006
 One of the Regions of Iran
Coquimbo Region, Chile
Southern Tagalog, Philippines
Calabarzon, Philippines

Region name disambiguation pages